Tierra de reyes (English: Land of Honor), is an American telenovela premiered on Telemundo on December 2, 2014, and concluded on July 27, 2015. The telenovela is created by the Venezuelan author Rossana Negrín, based on the Colombian-American drama written by Julio Jiménez, entitled Pasión de Gavilanes. Produced by Telemundo Studios, and distributed by Telemundo Internacional.

It stars Aarón Díaz, Gonzalo García Vivanco and Christian de la Campa as the Rey Gallardo Leon brothers, and Ana Lorena Sánchez, Kimberly Dos Ramos and Scarlet Gruber as the Del Juncos sisters, along to Sonya Smith and Fabián Ríos.

Plot 
Set in Houston, Texas, the story of the well-raised, humble and hardworking Gallardo brother's quest for vengeance against the wealthy and powerful Del Junco family. When the body of young, beautiful, and pregnant Alma Gallardo is found in the Houston River, her brother's Arturo, Samuel, and Flavio believe the family of her lover Ignacio Del Junco is to blame. Taking the last name "Rey" to disguise their identity, the brothers begin to work as construction workers at the sprawling Del Junco horse ranch to get closer to their enemy. With Ignacio already dead and learning how their beloved sister was mistreated by Ignacio's family, the brothers set out for revenge against Ignacio's widow, Cayetana, and her daughters Sofía, Irina, and Andrea. Their desire for vengeance and justice becomes more complicated when the Gallardo brothers and the Del Junco sisters begin to develop genuine feelings for each other. Complicating matters further, Sofía's scheming, opportunist husband and an arms smuggler who will stop at nothing to have the Del Junco ranch. The truth about the identity of the brothers becomes known to the Del Junco family and Cayetana develops hatred towards the Gallardo brothers. Matters worsen when Cayetana learns that Arturo is the one responsible for Sofia's pregnancy and becomes determined to see the brothers' downfall.

Cast

Main 
 Aarón Díaz as Arturo Rey Gallardo Leon; Sofía's second husband, Arturito's father, Flavio, Samuel and Alma's older brother and Verónica's older paternal half-brother.
 Ana Lorena Sánchez as Sofía del Junco de Gallardo; Arturo's wife, Arturito's mother, Cayetana's eldest daughter, Andrea and Irina's elder sister. 
 Kimberly Dos Ramos as Irina del Junco de Gallardo; Flavio's wife, Cayetana's youngest daughter, Sofía and Andrea's younger sister.
 Gonzalo García Vivanco as Flavio Rey Gallardo Leon; Irina's husband, Arturo, Samuel and Alma's brother and Verónica's half-brother. 
 Scarlet Gruber as Andrea del Junco de Gallardo; Samuel's second wife, Cayetana's second daughter, Sofía and Irina's sister. Though Andrea has her mother's temperament, she cannot help falling for Samuel and nearly suffered a mental breakdown when she learned he was marrying Beatriz.
 Christian de la Campa as Samuel Rey Gallardo Leon; Andrea's husband, Beatriz's widower, Patricia's ex-lover, Arturo, Flavio and Alma's brother and Verónica's half-brother. 
 Sonya Smith as Cayetana Belmonte del Junco; Sofía, Andrea and Irina's mother, Leonardo's former wife. An arrogant woman who cruelly insulted and mistreated Alma, she develops a fierce burning hatred for the Gallardo brothers and is determined to destroy them at whatever cost, which blinds her to reason and the real enemy.
 Fabián Ríos as Leonardo Montalvo; Sofía and Cayetana's ex-husband and a scheming, despicable opportunist (antagonist).
 Daniela Navarro as Patricia Rubio de Matamoros; a famous night club singer and Samuel's former lover who betrayed him and married Ulises.
 Omar Germenos as Emilio Valverde; family friend of the Del Juncos, Isadora's adopted father, and a dangerous arms trafficker and mob boss.
 Adriana Lavat as Soledad Flores de Gallardo; The Del Junco sisters' nanny/mother figure, Verónica's biological mother and José Antonio Gallardo's second wife.
 Eduardo Victoria as Néstor Fernández, the police chief who is friendly with the Gallardos and handles most of the investigations,who also falls in love with Cayetana.
 Joaquín Garrido as Don Felipe Belmonte; Cayetana's wheelchair user father and a retired army general, who detests Montalvo from the start.
 Cynthia Olavarría as Isadora Valverde; Emilio's daughter, obsessed with Arturo. She later discovers that her mother is still alive and that Valverde is not her real father.
 Isabella Castillo as Alma "Reina" Gallardo / Verónica Saldívar Gallardo de Martínez; Alma is the Reyes' brothers dead sister and later Verónica appeared and is revealed to be the Reyes' brothers half-sister from their father's side which explains Alma and Verónica's resemblance. 
 Diana Quijano as Beatriz Alcázar de la Fuente; Samuel's late wife and a kind-hearted, wealthy society lady.
 Ricardo Kleinbaum as Ulises Matamoros; Patricia's husband who works for Emilio. He is jealous of Patricia's relationship with Samuel and makes a few attempts to have Samuel murdered.
 Dad Dáger as Miranda Luján Saldívar; Verónica's adoptive mother and Cayetana's best friend 
 Alberich Bormann as Darío Luján; Irina's best friend/ex-fiancée and Miranda's nephew.
 Roberto Plantier as Horacio Luján; Andrea's ex-boyfriend, Miranda's nephew.
 Gabriel Rossi as Pablo Martínez; the Del Juncos' trusted foreman and Verónica's husband.
 Gloria Mayo as Juana Ramírez.
 José Ramón Blanch as Roger Molina.
 Fabián Pizzorno as Octavio Saldívar; Miranda's wife, Verónica's adoptive father
 Jessica Cerezo as Briggite Losada.
 Sol Rodríguez as Lucía Crespo Ramírez.
 Kary Musa as Candela Ríos, Patricia's friend and valet, who often disapproved of her fling with Samuel. She later becomes a club singer in her own right and develops a friendship with Don Felipe, whom she says reminds her of her own father.
 Julio Ocampo as Tomás Crespo.
 Orlando Miguel as Jack Malkovich, Valverde's henchman. 
 Fernando Pacanins as John Nicholson, Valverde's henchman. 
 Virginia Loreto as Nieves; the Del Juncos' trusted maid.
 Giovanna del Portillo as Rocío Méndez; the Del Juncos' trusted maid, who loves Pablo and deeply resents Veronica's presence in his life.But later falls in love with Mauricio and gets engaged to him
 Carmen Olivares as Matilde García.
 Rodrigo Aragón as Mauricio Cabrera, Fernandez's second-in-command who later falls for Rocio, the father of her unborn baby 
 Bárbara Garófalo as Linda Valverde; Emilio's niece.

Special guest stars 
 Ana Sofía Durán as Child Irina. 
 Joanna Hernández as Child Sofía.
 Macarena Oz as Child Andrea.
 Ricardo Chávez as Ignacio del Junco; Cayetana's husband, Alma Gallardo's lover, Sofia, Andrea and Irina's father.
 Guillermo Quintanilla as José Antonio Gallardo; Teresa's widower; Soledad's husband; Arturo, Samuel, Flavio, Alma and Veronica's father.
 Cecilia Melman as Teresa León de Gallardo; José Antonio's first wife, Arturo, Samuel, Flavio and Alma's mother.
 Viviana Ramos as Grace Varela, chief correspondent for Saldívar publications and Miranda's second-in-command. 
 Marissa del Portillo as Julia Ortiz, Isadora's mother who, after rejecting Emilio Valverde, is committed to a mental institution by him after he kills her husband (Isadora's biological father). 
 Damian Pastrana as Gustavo Mendez, Leonardo's trusted sidekick.

Production
Production of the telenovela was announced in September 2014.  Filming began in Miami and Houston on October 22. It is based on the Colombian telenovela Pasión de Gavilanes written by Julio Jiménez, adapted by Rossana Negrín.

Ratings

Awards and nominations

See also 

List of telenovelas of Telemundo
List of American telenovelas
List of telenovelas filmed in the United States

References

External links 
 
Land of Honor on Telemundo Internacional

Telemundo telenovelas
Spanish-language American telenovelas
2014 telenovelas
2014 American television series debuts
American telenovelas
2015 American television series endings
American television series based on telenovelas
American television series based on Colombian television series
Television shows set in Houston